Dan Sartain Lives is the fifth album by the Birmingham, Alabama rock musician Dan Sartain, released in 2010 by One Little Indian.

Track listing

References

2010 albums
Dan Sartain albums
One Little Independent Records albums